List of Consuls in Jerusalem, Jaffa, Haifa, and Eilat from German states. Prussia, the North German Confederacy and thereafter Germany maintained diplomatic missions in the Holy Land. The Jerusalem consulate was based on 57 Street of the Prophets at the corner with Wallenberg Street, Jerusalem. The Consulate also had affiliated vice-consulates in Jaffa and Haifa. The aim of the consulates was to represent the respective German states in the Holy Land or parts thereof. After Nazi Germany started the Second World War the consulates closed. In 1965 official diplomatic relations were established between the 1948 founded Israel and the 1949 founded West Germany. Since there is a German embassy in Tel Aviv, and later, as its affiliates, honorary consulates opened in Haifa and Eilat.

List of consuls in Jerusalem as of 1842

Prussian consuls
Before being elevated to a consulate of its own in 1845, the Prussian diplomatic mission in Jerusalem was a vice-consulate affiliated to the Prussian consulate in Ottoman Beirut. Occasionally consuls were personally ranked as consul general.

 1842–1845: 
 1845–1851:  as consul of Jerusalem
 1852–1867: Dr. Georg Rosen
 1867–1869: Prof. Julius Petermann

North German consul
In 1869 the Prussian consulate was taken over by the newly founded North German Confederacy. 
 1869–1871:  (till 21 June 1871 for the North German Confederacy), personally ranked consul general

German consuls and consuls general
On 22 June 1871 the North German consulate was taken over by the newly founded Germany. In 1872 the consular ambit comprised the Ottoman districts of Akka, Balqa-Nablus and Jerusalem. Consuls were occasionally personally ranked as consul general, however, only in 1913 the Jerusalem consulate was elevated to consulate general.<ref name="Löffler 2008 127">Roland Löffler, Protestanten in Palästina: Religionspolitik, sozialer Protestantismus und Mission in den deutschen evangelischen und anglikanischen Institutionen des Heiligen Landes 1917-1939, (=Konfession und Gesellschaft; vol. 37), Stuttgart: Kohlhammer, 2008, p. 127. </ref> After the British conquest of Jerusalem in 1917 and the German defeat in 1918 only in 1926 the consulate general reopened. 
 1871–1873:  Georg Friedrich August von Alten (since 22 June 1871 for Germany), personally ranked consul general
 1873–1874: Chancellor Otto Kersten, per pro 
 1874–1881:  (1835–1909)
 1881–1885: Dr. Julius Reitz 
 1886–1899: Dr. Paul Andreas von Tischendorf (1847–1914), as of 1898 personally ranked consul general
 1899–1900: Dr. Friedrich Rosen
 1901–1916: Edmund Schmidt (1855–1916), as consul general since 1914
 1916–1917: Dr. Johann Wilhelm Heinrich Brode (1874-1936) as consul general  
 1917–1926: The Spanish consulate took care of the German citizens 
1921–1925: Karl Kapp (1889-1947) as German vice-consul attached to the Spanish consulate, 1936-1941 consul in Cleveland 
 1925–1932: Dr. Erich August Karl Nord (1889-1935) as consul general 
 1933–1935: 
 1936–1939:  (1884-1945), as consul general
 1939–1945: The Swiss consulate took care of the German citizens

 List of consuls in Jaffa as of 1872
Before the formal establishment of a vice-consulate affiliated with the Jerusalem consulate, there were consular agents, affiliated with the consulate in Beirut. In 1872, the mission in Jaffa was elevated to a vice-consulate, advancing again in 1914 to consulate, remaining throughout affiliated to the Jerusalem consulate (general; as of 1913). With the British conquest of Jaffa in 1917, the consulate closed. The London Gazette of 23 December 1932 circumscribes the consular ambit as follows: Tel Aviv, Jaffa and the coast south thereof incl. Ghazzah with the hinterland also comprising Lydda, Ramleh, Sarona, Tulkarm und Wilhelma. 

 1872–1897: Simeon Murad
 1897–1901: Edmund Schmidt 
 1901–1905: Dr. Eugen Büge (1859–1936)
 1905–1908: 
 1908–1910: vacancy?
 1910–1916: Dr. Johann Wilhelm Heinrich Brode (1874-1936), till 1911 only per pro, as of 1911 as vice-consul, as of 1914 as consul
 1916–1917: 
 1917-1926: The German consulate in Jaffa remained closed
 1926-1932: ?
 1932-1939: Timotheus Wurst (1874-1961)

 List of consuls in Haifa as of 1877
Originally a vice-consulate, the Haifa mission was affiliated to the Jerusalem consulate. After the Jerusalem mission had been elevated to consulate general in 1913, the Haifa mission became a consulate in 1914. The London Gazette'' of 25 March 1938 circumscribes the Haifa consular ambit as follows: Haifa and her hinterland including Acre, Bosra, Jenin, Nazareth, Safed and Tiberias. The Haifa consulate closed with the British conquest of Haifa on 23 September 1918 till 1926 and again in 1939. An honorary consulate-general was opened after 1989.

 1877–1878: 
 1878–1908:  (1838-1913) 
 1909: Theodor Georg Weber
 1909–1915: 
 1915–1918: 
 1915–1917: vacancy
 1917, 10 May to 10 August: , per pro 
 10 August 1917 to 2 April 1918: Friedrich Werner von der Schulenburg, per pro
 1918, 2 April to 20 June: Dr. Kurt Max Paul Ziemke
 1918–1926: no German mission in Haifa
 1926–1937: ?
 1937–1939:  
 1939–1989: no German mission in Haifa
 1989 to present: Michael Pappe, honorary consul general

List of consuls in Eilat
An honorary consulate was opened after 1965. 
 2005 to present: Barbara Pfeffer

References 

Consuls Germany
Consuls Germany
Consuls Germany
Jerusalem
Consuls
Consuls of Germany
Consuls of Germany
Consuls
Consuls
Jerusalem